Judge Duncan may refer to:

Allyson K. Duncan (born 1951), judge of the United States Court of Appeals for the Fourth Circuit
Kyle Duncan (judge) (born 1972), judge of the United States Court of Appeals for the Fifth Circuit
Richard M. Duncan (1889–1974), judge of the United States District Courts for the Eastern and the Western Districts of Missouri
Robert Morton Duncan (1927–2012), judge of the United States District Court for the Southern District of Ohio

See also
Justice Duncan (disambiguation)